Nikita Shu (舒子晨 Shūzi Chén, born 6 May 1991), real name Chen Yingying (陳盈穎 Chén Yíngyǐng), is a Taiwanese singer, actress and television presenter. She appeared in a fixed team in the variety show University. She participated in the TV draft show Chaoji Mo Wang Dadao 2, in which she finished sixth place, with dancing, pole dancing, and cooperation. In 2016, she formed the group Fangui Xiaojie with Lu Yu-ling and Kang Yin-yin; and later made a solo single in 2015: Princess of Iron. She released a personal photo album from the beginning of 2017, by Sharp Point Publishing. In mid-2017, she is the innovative programme assistant of presenter Lin Yu-Chih in Tongxue! Gao Shenme Gui?; and at the end of 2017, she co-presented Ruby Hsu and Blackie Chen in Shangban Zhe Dang Shì.

Discography

Singles
2015 Princess of Iron

Filmography

TV series

Films

Presenting
{|class="wikitable"
|-
! Year !! Title !! Channel
|-
| 2017 || Huan You Shijie 800 Tian' || Alda Comprehensive Station, Alda Theatre
|-
| 2017 || Tongxue! Gao Shenme Gui || Eight comprehensive stations (co-presented with Lin Yu-Chih)
|-
| 2018 || Shangban Zhe Dang Shi || TVBS Happy Taiwan (co-presented with Blackie Chen)
|}

Publications

Programme announcementsVariety Get Together (Formosa TV)The Gang of Kuo Kuan (SET Metro)Genius Go Go Go (CTS)Guanjun Renwu (Star Chinese Channel)Hot Door Night (SET Metro)Mr. Player (CTV or SET Metro)Super Entourage (CTi Variety or CTi Entertainment)Guimi Ai Luxing (TVBS Entertainment Channel)18 Sui Bu Shui (CTi Variety)The Hunger Games (CTV)The Queen's Legendary Show (CTi Variety)Stylish Man - The Chef (SET Metro)The Poker Age'' (CTi Entertainment)

References

External links

 
 
 

1991 births
Living people
Taiwanese television actresses
Taiwanese Buddhists
Fu Jen Catholic University alumni